William Summers (born 14 July 1893) was a Scottish professional footballer who played as a centre half.

Career
Born in Burnbank, Summers played for Burnbank Athletic, Airdrieonians, St Bernard's, St Mirren, Bradford City, Rochdale and Newport County. For Bradford City, he made 121 appearances in the Football League; he also made 11 FA Cup appearances.

Summers also earned one international cap for Scotland in 1926.

Sources

References

1893 births
Year of death missing
Scottish footballers
Footballers from Hamilton, South Lanarkshire
Scotland international footballers
St Mirren F.C. players
Burnbank Athletic F.C. players
Airdrieonians F.C. (1878) players
St Bernard's F.C. players
Bradford City A.F.C. players
Newport County A.F.C. players
English Football League players
Scottish Football League players
Association football central defenders
Scotland junior international footballers
Scottish Junior Football Association players
Place of death missing